Physoptilinae is a subfamily of moths in the family Gelechiidae.

Taxonomy and systematics
Physoptila Meyrick, 1914

References

Physoptilinae at funet

 
Gelechiidae